Borys Rozenberh (born 9 July 1962) is a Ukrainian table tennis player. He competed in the men's doubles event at the 1988 Summer Olympics.

References

1962 births
Living people
Ukrainian male table tennis players
Olympic table tennis players of the Soviet Union
Table tennis players at the 1988 Summer Olympics
Place of birth missing (living people)